Abu Dhabi Harlequins is a rugby union and rugby league team based in Abu Dhabi, UAE. They currently play in the UAE Premiership. The teams was founded as the Abu Dhabi RUFC in 1970. 

The 'Quins' were recently crowned UAE Premiership Champions of the 2022 rugby season, having had an entire 2020/21 season without any rugby at all due to covid restrictions.

They beat the Dubai Exiles 28-34 in the UAE Premiership Final.

2012-13 Squad
in bold = players internationals

Notable players 
 Jeremy Manning - 50 caps for Munster Rugby, 30 for Newcastle Falcons.
 Sean Crombie - Scotland U21 and Scotland 7's international. Former Edinburgh Rugby and Newcastle Falcons player
 Ed Lewsey - Wales U19 international. former Exeter Chiefs and Plymouth Albion player
 Ben Bolger - former London Broncos (Super League) rugby league footballer.

Rugby League 
The Harlequins switched to rugby league in 2013, taking part in the inaugural Emirates Rugby League Cup competition. They were the inaugural Emirates Rugby League champions, beating Mana Dubai in the final of the competition.

See also

References

Rugby clubs established in 1970
Rugby league in the United Arab Emirates
Rugby union in the United Arab Emirates
Defunct rugby league teams
Asian rugby union teams
Sport in Abu Dhabi